Stanley Vernard Grant Sr (born 1940) AM is an elder of the Wiradjuri tribe of Indigenous Australians from what is now the south-west inland region of the state of New South Wales, Australia. Stan Grant Sr is of Aboriginal ancestry. The grandson of an elder who was gaoled for speaking his own language, he now teaches the Wiradjuri language to students.

Background and language work
Grant was at one time a saw miller, losing the tips of three fingers in industrial accidents.

Grant is one of the few people still living to have heard native speakers of his tribe's Wiradjuri language, having been brought up as a child around native speakers of his grandfather's generation, notably his grandfather, Wilfred Johnson. Johnson was arrested in the late 1940s after a policeman overheard him calling to his son in Wiradjuri - it was forbidden to use Aboriginal languages in public - and he was detained overnight in a cell. From that day on, his grandfather refrained from speaking his native language in public.

He has been crucial to the reconstruction of the Wiradjuri language along with Dr John Rudder, with whom he travels among the Wiradjuri people, teaching their language. From a small base of anthropological records, they have rebuilt the spoken and sung language among both urban and rural tribal members. In 2005 they published "A New Wiradjuri Dictionary”, running to some 600 pages. In 2006 this work was recognised with the Deadly Award of  Outstanding Achievement in Aboriginal and Torres Strait Islander Education.

Personal
Grant is the father of Australian and international television personality and journalist, Stan Grant.

In May 2017, the son interviewed his father to commemorate the 50th anniversary of the 1967 referendum to alter the Constitution of Australia to recognise Aboriginal people. The father discussed how he experienced overt racism as a young man. "Racism was in your face. I was called nigger, boong, coon, abbo, blackie, you name it, I copped it all the time. You couldn't own a block of land, you couldn't own a house, you had to rent one. You couldn't be out late at night, you had to [be] gone by sundown from the street. There were many, many, things we couldn't do." Yet, he later noted differences in how people treated him. "In 69-70 there I noticed there were some changes being made. The racism that was in our face, wasn't there, it was behind us a bit, it was more of an undercurrent. It gave us the right to be citizens, in our country that was ours in the first place."

Publications 
 Stories Told By My Grandfather and the Other Old Men: a collection of short stories (1999)
 Crossing Cultures: experiences of growing up Aboriginal in Wiradjuri country (1999)

With Dr John Rudder:
 Learning Wiradjuri 1-5 (graded texts)
 Learning Wiradjuri 1&2 CD 
 A Teaching Wiradjuri Support CD 
 Eric Looks for a Friend (PowerPoint book) 
 Wiradjuri Language Songs for Children 
 Wiradjuri Language Song Book 2 
 CD of Wiradjuri Language Songs 
 Wiradjuri Language – How it works: A Grammar in Everyday English 
 Wiradjuri Language A First Dictionary of Wiradjuri 
 Wiradjuri Sentence Book 
 Wiradjuri Language Black Line Poster Masters 
 Wiradjuri Language Black Line Masters – Book 1 (Colouring-in) 
 Wiradjuri Language Black Line Masters – Book 2 – Learn to Draw 
 Wiradjuri Language Colouring-in Books 1 and 2 
 Wiradjuri Language Learn to Draw Books 1 and 2 
 English Language Blackline Poster Masters of Australian Natural Science & People 
 Unlabelled Blackline Poster Masters of Australian Natural Science & People

Honours 
Grant was named a Member of the Order of Australia on 8 June 2009 "for service to Indigenous education and the preservation and promotion of the Wiradjuri language and culture, as a teacher and author, and to youth".  He was granted an honorary Doctorate of Letters by Charles Sturt University in December 2013 in recognition of his work with the indigenous communities. The vice-chancellor of CSU, Andrew Vann is quoted as saying "[Grant] has made an outstanding contribution to Charles Sturt University's regions, especially to Indigenous communities … As an Elder, author and teacher, he has made an outstanding intellectual contribution to our communities. His deep involvement in the introduction of the University's new Graduate Certificate in Wiradjuri Language, Culture and Heritage program in 2014 is a clear demonstration of his work."

See also
 List of Indigenous Australian group names

References

External links
 Profile at rosella.apana.org
 Aboriginal languages

Living people
Australian Aboriginal elders
Wiradjuri people
Members of the Order of Australia
1940 births